Mental hospital may refer to:

Psychiatric hospital
Mental Hospital, Pabna, a psychiatric hospital in Bangladesh
Mental Hospital and Institutional Workers' Union, a former trade union in the United Kingdom

See also